The large moth family Crambidae contains the following genera beginning with "T":

References 

 T
Crambid